Douchebags and Donuts is a stand-up comedy film hosted by comedian Denis Leary, released by Comedy Central.

The DVD was released by Comedy Central on January 18, 2011, containing special features, deleted scenes and all completely uncensored and uncut.

References

External links

2011 live albums
Comedy Central Records live albums
Stand-up comedy albums
Spoken word albums by American artists
Live spoken word albums
2011 comedy films
2011 films
American comedy films
2010s English-language films
2010s American films